The Naga Wrestling Championship is a wrestling tournament organized by the Nagaland Wrestling Association. Initially held as an annual event, it has now been held biennially since 1974 and is the biggest sport event in Nagaland, India.

Venüzo Dawhuo emerged as the champion of the 28th Edition of the Naga Wrestling Championship held on 28 February 2022.

Champions

See also 
 Kene (Naga wrestling)

References

External links 

Naga games